Mobula eregoodootenkee, the pygmy devil ray or longhorned mobula, is a species of ray in the family Mobulidae. It is endemic to the Indian Ocean and central-west Pacific Ocean. It ranges from South Africa in the west to the Philippines in the east, north to Vietnam, and south to the northern coast of Australia.

It is a brownish-grey colour, with a whitish underside. It grows up to 100 cm wide. The species feeds on plankton and small fish.

The longhorned mobula is an ovoviviparous fish, usually giving birth to a single pup in shallow waters. The young stay in these waters until they mature.

The ray is likely a bycatch at several fisheries, being entangled in nets meant for other species. It is marketed in Thailand and possibly elsewhere in southeast Asia.

References

External links
 Pygmy Devilray @ Fishes of Australia

eregoodootenkee
Fish of the Indian Ocean
Marine fish of South Africa
Fish of the Red Sea
Palk Strait
Fish of Bangladesh
Fish of Cambodia
Marine fish of Australia
Ovoviviparous fish
Fish described in 1859
Taxobox binomials not recognized by IUCN